The Type 344 is a multifunctional fire control radar (FCR) developed by the Xian Research Institute of Navigation Technology (西安导航技术研究所)/XRINT/ No. 20th Research Institute.

It can track two batches of target simultaneously and measure the position deviation between the shell and the target, constantly calibrating the gun's firing parameters in action. The system also includes a TV tracker and laser range finder. It is used to control 76m, 100mm and 130mm guns in PLAN service. 



Specifications
 Uses phase scanning techniques
 Uses pulse compression, MTI (Moving Target Indicator) and CFAR (Constant False Alarm Rate)
 Traveling Wave Tube (TWT) amplifier
 Independent search capability in 10" X 10"
 Able to track both surface and airborne targets
 TV tracking/Laser Range finding

Applications
 Type 051C Luzhou class destroyer
 Type 052  Luhu class destroyer
 Type 052B Guangzhou class destroyer
 Type 052C Lanzhou class destroyer
 Type 054  Ma'anshan class frigate

External links
 China Electronics Technology Group Corporation (CETC)  

Sea radars
Military radars of the People's Republic of China